The men's 100 metre butterfly competition of the 2014 FINA World Swimming Championships (25 m) was held on 3 December with the heats and the semifinals and 4 December with the final.

Records
Prior to the competition, the existing world and championship records were as follows.

The following records were established during the competition:

Results

Heats
The heats were held at 11:50.

Semifinals
The semifinals were held at 18:59.

Semifinal 1

Semifinal 2

Final
The final was held at 19:31.

References

Men's 100 metre butterfly